Bicazu Ardelean is a commune in Neamț County, Romania. It is composed of three villages: Bicazu Ardelean, Telec (Gyergyózsedánpatak), and Ticoș (Tikos). 

Located on the western border of Neamț County, Bicazu Ardelean is one of three communes in the county (most of which is in Western Moldavia) that are part of the historic region of Transylvania.

The commune lies on the banks of the Bicaz River and its tributaries, the Capra and the Bistra. Directly to the north is the imposing Ceahlău Massif, while the Hășmaș Mountains are to the southwest. It neighbors the following communes:  Grințieș and Ceahlău to the north, Tașca to the east, Bicaz-Chei to the south, and Tulgheș, Harghita County to the west.

Bicazu Ardelean is traversed by national road , which starts in Bicaz,  to the east; the road continues through the scenic Bicaz Gorge, passes by the Red Lake, and ends in Gheorgheni,  to the west, in Harghita County.

The  (located on Pârâul Caprei Street in Telec village) is listed as a historic monument by the National Register of Historic Monuments.

References

External links

 

Communes in Neamț County
Localities in Transylvania